Edwin George Gooch (15 January 1889 – 2 August 1964) was a British Labour Party politician and trade union leader.

Gooch was born in Wymondham, Norfolk, where he lived his entire life. He worked for a printer, then became a journalist.  He joined the National Union of Journalists and became chair of its Norwich branch. He worked as election agent for George Edwards. He was elected as a Labour Party member of his parish, district and county councils, later being appointed an alderman for Norfolk County Council

In 1935, when Wymondham Urban District Council was created, Gooch became the first Chairman of the new UDC and held the office for most of the period up to 1946.  His wife, Ethel Gooch, became the council's first lady member in 1935 and its first lady Chairman in 1951.

Gooch was elected to the executive committee of the National Union of Agricultural and Allied Workers in 1926, and served as the union's president from 1928 until his death in 1964.

At the 1931 general election, he was an unsuccessful candidate in the Conservative-held South Norfolk constituency.

Gooch did not contest the 1935 general election, but at the 1945 general election, he was elected as Member of Parliament for North Norfolk, defeating the Conservative MP Thomas Cook. He held the seat until his death shortly before the 1964 general election, aged 75.

He was chairman of the Labour Party's National Executive Committee from 1955 to 1956.

References

External links 
 

1889 births
1964 deaths
Labour Party (UK) MPs for English constituencies
Members of Norfolk County Council
National Union of Agricultural and Allied Workers-sponsored MPs
UK MPs 1945–1950
UK MPs 1950–1951
UK MPs 1951–1955
UK MPs 1955–1959
UK MPs 1959–1964
People from Wymondham
Chairs of the Labour Party (UK)
Presidents of the National Union of Agricultural and Allied Workers